Pervoye Tseplyayevo is a rural locality (a selo) and the administrative center of Pervotseplyayevskoye Rural Settlement, Shebekinsky District, Belgorod Oblast, Russia. The population was 758 as of 2010. There are 3 streets.

Geography 
Pervoye Tseplyayevo is located 36 km northeast of Shebekino (the district's administrative centre) by road. Surkovo is the nearest rural locality.

References 

Rural localities in Shebekinsky District